Never Never Love may refer to:
 Never Never Love (album), an album by Pop Levi
 Never Never Love (song), a 1996 song by Simply Red